Clarence Lyell O'Shea, more commonly known as Clarrie O'Shea (1906–1988), was the Victorian State Secretary of the Australian Tramway and Motor Omnibus Employees' Association who was jailed in 1969 by Sir John Kerr for contempt of the Industrial Court when he disobeyed a court order that his union pay $8,100 in fines, under the penal sections of the Conciliation and Arbitration Act.

A lifelong Communist, O'Shea was a leading member of the pro-China Communist Party of Australia (Marxist-Leninist) (CPA(ML)) at the time he was imprisoned.

O'Shea's jailing triggered the largest postwar national strike largely organised by left unions (and against the open opposition of the Victorian Trades Hall Council and the Labor Council of New South Wales) when one million workers stopped work over six days to demand "Free Clarrie and repeal the penal powers". On the sixth day O'Shea was released when the fines were paid by a man who claimed to have won the New South Wales lottery.

Over the previous five years, the Tramways Union had militantly defended and improved the conditions of its members. The union had accumulated 40 fines totalling $13,200 imposed on it by the Conciliation and Arbitration Court. Due to the inaction of Melbourne Trades Hall, twenty seven left wing unions had caucused together in response to the perceived attacks on unionism by the widespread application of fines. They called a mass delegates meeting for the day of the hearing that was attended by 5,000 delegates. After the meeting the delegates marched to the courthouse led by Clarrie O'Shea.

In court O'Shea refused to take the oath, then refused to present the union books, in line with the wishes of the members of his union, and was formally arrested and sentenced for contempt of court on Thursday 15 May 1969 and taken to HM Prison Pentridge. This led to immediate walk outs on the Thursday, and a general strike which paralysed Victoria on the Friday. There were two 24-hour stoppages in Victoria, involving 40 unions. All trains and trams stopped, delivery of goods was severely restricted, the power supply was cut and TV and radio broadcasts were disrupted. Protests and strike action also occurred in regional Victoria with the Geelong Trades Hall Council supporting the strikes and similar action in Bendigo, Ballarat, and the Latrobe Valley.

All together, about 500,000 workers struck across Australia on Friday, 16 May. The Trades and Labour Council of WA, the Queensland Trades and Labour Council and the United Trades and Labour Council of South Australia all called statewide general strikes. In Queensland, mass meetings or strikes occurred in 20 cities, while Trades and Labour Councils in Newcastle, Wollongong and Canberra called out members of affiliated unions. The Tasmanian Trades and Labour Council also refused to sanction any action, while 22 'rebel' affiliated unions representing 50,000 workers (80% of Tasmania's workforce) organized a general stoppage.

Protests calling for O'Shea's release occurred outside HM Prison Pentridge in Coburg over the weekend.

On Tuesday 20 May, Dudley MacDougall, a former advertising manager for the Australian Financial Review, acting on "behalf of a public benefactor", paid the union's fines. Kerr ordered O'Shea to be released. Although the penal laws were not repealed, they have never been used again.

References

John Merritt, 'The Trade Union Leader Who Went to Jail', Canberra Historical Journal (September 2007), no 59, p 8.
After the Strikes are Over, Tribune, London, 6 June 1969. P8 as published in A Documentary History of the Australian Labor Movement 1850-1975, Brian McKinley, (1979) 
Court exchange between Clarrie O'Shea and Mr Justice Kerr, The Independent Australian, Vol 2 No 3, as published in A Documentary History of the Australian Labor Movement 1850-1975, Brian McKinley, (1979) 
Arrowsmith, John, Abolish the penal powers: freedoms fight of '69, 1969, on the Reason in Revolt - Source documents in Australian Radicalism website

External links
A photo of Clarrie O'Shea can be seen here

1906 births
1988 deaths
Australian communists
Australian trade unionists